Marjan Smit (born September 29, 1975, in Breda) is a Dutch softball player, who represents the Dutch national team in international competitions.

Smit played for Twins Sport Club, Zwijndrecht and since 2004 she is back at the Twins. She is an outfielder and second baseman who bats and throws right-handed. She competes for the Dutch national team since 1999. In 2002 she stole the most bases in the Dutch Softball Hoofdklasse. She is part of the Dutch team for the 2008 Summer Olympics in Beijing.

External links
 Smit at dutchsoftballteam.com

References

1975 births
Living people
Dutch softball players
Olympic softball players of the Netherlands
Softball players at the 2008 Summer Olympics
Sportspeople from Breda